Abdullatif Ahmad Mustafa (born 1969) is a Kurdish religious figure and a Salafi preacher in Iraqi Kurdistan.

Personal life 
After completing his primary, secondary and high school education, he went to Baghdad to learn Arabic and was admitted to the Arabic Department of Al-Mustansiriya University. After graduating from the university in 1992, he was employed as a teacher in Chwarqurna, a small city in Ranya District. After a while, he left the country and visited several other Islamic countries to study Sharia. He later completed his master's and doctorate in Tikrit. He then earned another doctorate in Saudi Arabia.

Abdullatif Ahmad has appeared in Kurdish media several times. In 2012, he appeared in a series of videos on NRT News. He is currently the director of Amozhgari, a Salafi channel in the Kurdish language, and the imam of the Behesht Mosque in Sulaymaniyah.

References 

Kurdish Muslims
Salafi scholars